The Psychopath, also known as An Eye for an Eye, is a 1973 horror film written by Walter Dallenbach, produced and directed by Larry G. Brown and John Ashton as one of its co-stars.

Plot 
Mr. Rabbey, the host of a children's television show, is every boys' and girls' favorite. But unknown to everyone, when he hears stories from the kids who watch his show about the abuse they suffer at the hands of their parents, he starts visiting the parents and murdering them. Eventually, the police begin to suspect him of the murders.

Cast 
 Tom Basham as Mr. Rabbey
 Gene Carlson as Burt Mitchell
 Gretchen Kanne as Carolyn
 David Carlile as Perry Forbes
 Barbara Grover as Judy Cirlin
 Lance Larsen as Harold Cirlin
 Jeff Rice as Richard
 Peter Renaday as Lt. Hayes (as Pete Renoudet)
 Jackson Bostwick as Sgt. Graham
 John Ashton as Sgt. Matthews (as John D. Ashton)
 Mary Rings as Mother in Park
 Margaret Avery as Nurse
 Sam Jarvis as Coroner
 Brenda Venus as Joanie
 Carol Ann Daniels as Mrs. D'Sicca
 Bruce Kimball as Mr. D'Sicca

Re-release
In 1980, an edited version of the film was released.  In this version, all of the murders were removed.

Remake
A remake, Maniac 2: Mr. Robbie, was shot in 1986 by Joe Spinell and director Buddy Giovinazzo as a sequel to the former's 1980 slasher film Maniac, following a psychopathic children's television show host who murders abusive parents. The short was done to raise financing for a sequel to Maniac (ultimately unmade due to Spinell's death in 1989), and was included with the 30th anniversary edition release of Maniac.

See also
 List of American films of 1973

References

External links
 
 

1973 films
1973 horror films
American horror films
American independent films
1970s English-language films
1970s American films